Mikhail Gennadyevich Zingarevich (born July 8, 1959) is a Russian entrepreneur and philanthropist, an investor in IT, pulp-and-paper and gold mining industries, property development, a member of the board of directors of the Ilim Group, President of Plaza Lotus Group, honorary professor of the Highest School of Technology and Energy at the St. Petersburg State University for Technology and Design.

Early life
Mikhail Zingarevich was born in and grew up in a Russian town of Sebezh (Pskov region). His parents were teachers, father was head of a school specialized in mathematics at a town's school. Mikhail has a twin-brother named Boris.
The greatest hobby of Mikhail and his twin-brother during their childhood was ice hockey. They took part in a nationwide "The Golden puck" tournament, and were repeatedly recognized as the best forwards. The brothers had good prospects for a sporting career, but opted for education. The town of Segezha is home to the Segezha pulp-and-paper plant, and this fact influenced the choice of profession.

Business career
Mikhail Zingarevich graduated from the Leningrad Technological Institute for the Pulp and Paper Industry in 1981. He received a degree in the machinery and mechanics of the pulp and paper industry. He became an honorary professor of the Highest School of Technology and Energy at the St. Petersburg State University for Technology and Design (former Leningrad Technological Institute for the Pulp and Paper Industry) in 2008.

From 1981 to 1991 he held various engineering positions at pulp and paper companies, including the Segezha pulp-and-paper plant and Izmail pulp-and-cardboard mill. In 1991, he became the Chief Sales Manager of Technoferm. In this role he established the cellulose and paper export sales processes. In 1992, he and his partners founded Ilim Pulp Enterprise pulp and paper company. As a marketing and logistics director, he established the company's transport, logistics and sales in Eastern and Western Europe and China. In 1996, he set up an Ilim Pulp's representative office of in Beijing, China, where he was in charge of sales, marketing and development of new products.

Since 2001, he was a member of Ilim Pulp Enterprise board of directors with responsibility for sales, marketing and new businesses development. Since 2006, he has been a board member of Ilim Group, chairman of HR committee. Ilim Group is now part of the International Paper.

In 2009, he co-founded the Plaza Lotus Group development company. The main projects of this company to date have been the SINOP business centre at Sinopskaya embankment, the reconstruction of the historic building of the Stables Department and Emperor Pavel's military barracks, all of which are in St. Petersburg, Russia.

The first company's project, the SINOP business centre, has been put into operation and further sold to the Moscow's RBM Capital management company for 2 billion rubles in 2014.
The reconstruction of the historic building of the Stables Department was projected to host an apart-hotel in the building. The company signed an investment contract with St. Petersburg authorities in 2010 and got a construction permit in 2013. But historic preservation activists opposed the project. As a result of media attention being garnered by the activists, in early 2016, the city authorities proposed the investor, which had already invested 1.2 billion rubles, a few sites in St. Petersburg for construction of hotels.

Ice hockey
In 2011, Mikhail Zingarevich with his twin-brother Boris founded the Nevsky Legion ice hockey team with Mikhail as a captain. The team became the champion of the IV Ice Hockey Amateur Teams Festival in Russia, which was held in a city of Sochi in 2015.

References

1959 births
Living people
Businesspeople from Saint Petersburg
Russian philanthropists
Saint Petersburg State Institute of Technology alumni
Businesspeople in the pulp and paper industry
Russian businesspeople in real estate
People from Sebezh